is a temple of the Tendai sect in Kobe, Hyōgo, Japan. 
It was established by Empress Genshō's instruction in 716.

Taisan-ji's Main Hall completed in 1293 is a National Treasure of Japan.

Building list 
Main Hall - National Treasure of Japan. It was rebuilt in 1293.
Sanmon (Niō Gate) - Important Cultural Property. It was rebuilt in Muromachi period.
Pagoda - It was built in 1688.
Amidadō - It was built in 1688.
Gomadō - It was built in Edo period
Shakadō - It was built in Edo period
Rakandō - It was built in Edo period
Kannondō
Bell tower

Tatchu temples (Branch) 
An'yō-in - It's Karesansui is Japan's Places of Scenic Beauty.
Jōju-in 
Ryuzō-in 
Henjō-in 
Kanki-in

See also 
National Treasures of Japan
List of National Treasures of Japan (temples)

Gallery

External links 

Official Site (Japanese)

8th-century establishments in Japan
National Treasures of Japan
Important Cultural Properties of Japan
Pagodas in Japan
Tendai temples
Buildings and structures in Kobe
Buddhist temples in Hyōgo Prefecture
Tourist attractions in Kobe
Religious buildings and structures completed in 716